Love is a 1991 Indian Hindi-language romance film directed by Suresh Krissna, starring Salman Khan, Revathi (in her Bollywood debut) in the lead roles. It is the remake of the Telugu film Prema (1989). It could not repeat the success of the original and ended up as an average grosser. The makers changed the tragic climax from the original film to one with a happy ending. This movie is also remembered for the romantic song "Saathiya Tune Kya Kiya". The rights to this film are owned by Shah Rukh Khan's Red Chillies Entertainment.

Plot
Jailed as a juvenile for killing his abusive father (Sudhir Kumar), who is responsible for his mother's suicide, Prithvi (Salman Khan) is unable to stand any atrocity. He meets Maggie Pinto (Revathi Menon) and after a few chance meetings, they both fall in love. Maggie takes Prithvi to meet her parents, but they reject him after learning about his criminal past. When Maggie and Prithvi persist, Maggie's mother, Stella Pinto (Rita Bhaduri), calls the police and has Prithvi jailed. Guruji (Amjad Khan) comes to Prithvi's aid and bails him out. Prithvi and Maggie continue their courtship, but Stella finds out and intervenes, sending goons to attack Prithvi, during which Maggie is injured. How this affects everyone close to her is the crux of the story.

Cast
 Salman Khan as Prithvi Pandith
 Revathi as Maggie Pinto
 Amjad Khan aa Guruji
 Babloo Mukherjee as Prithvi's Friend
 Shafi Inamdar as John Pinto
 Rita Bhaduri as Stella Pinto
 Suhas Joshi as Prithvi's mother
 Sudhir as Prithvi's Father

Soundtrack

The songs are based on the original music composed for Telugu movie Prema.  It was released on Venus Records & Tapes and composed by Anand–Milind

References

External links
 

1991 films
1991 romantic drama films
1990s Hindi-language films
Films directed by Suresh Krissna
Films scored by Ilaiyaraaja
Hindi remakes of Telugu films
Indian romantic drama films